Philippe Decourroux (born November 21, 1962) is a Christian Swiss singer-songwriter.  Philippe Bieri took the stage name Philipe Decourroux meaning "from Courroux" (his home town). He's a drummer and singer, but he also plays the piano and the guitar. He wrote many songs and released eight albums.

Discography 
 Ambassadeurs (1993)
 Entre le rose et le noir (1995)
 Comme avant (1997)
 Pour mieux t'aimer (1998)
 Pour toi (2001)
 Tant qu'il y aura des hommes (2002)
 Pour toi mon Dieu (Jurassic Praise Band) (2003)
 Une autre terre (2005)
 A contre-courant (2007/2008)

External links 
 Philippe Decourroux's website

1962 births
Living people
Performers of Christian music
Swiss male singers
Swiss Christians
French-language singers of Switzerland
Swiss-French people